

Central banks 
Deutsche Bundesbank, Frankfurt
European Central Bank, Frankfurt

Local banks 

BayernLB, Munich
Bremer Bank, Bremen
Commerzbank, Frankfurt
Consorsbank, Nuremberg
DAB BNP Paribas, Munich
DekaBank (Germany), Frankfurt
Deutsche Bank, Frankfurt
Deutsche Pfandbriefbank, Garching bei München (next to Munich)
DZ Bank, Frankfurt
GLS Bank, Bochum
Hamburg Commercial Bank (formerly HSH Nordbank), Hamburg
KfW, Frankfurt
Landesbank Baden-Württemberg, Stuttgart
Landesbank Berlin Holding, Berlin
Landesbank Hessen-Thüringen, Frankfurt
Landwirtschaftliche Rentenbank
National-Bank AG, Essen
FIDOR bank AG
N26, Berlin
Nord/LB, Hanover
NRW.Bank, Düsseldorf
Portigon Financial Services, Düsseldorf
solarisBank, Berlin
Wirecard Bank

Co-operative banks 
see: German Cooperative Financial Group

Sparkassen 
see: Sparkassen-Finanzgruppe

Investment banks
 Baader Bank AG, Unterschleißheim
 Varengold Bank, Hamburg

Foreign banks

EU banks
Allied Irish Banks, Frankfurt
Banco Santander, Mönchengladbach
Barclays Bank, Hamburg
BNP Paribas, Frankfurt
Crédit Lyonnais, Frankfurt
DHB Bank, Düsseldorf
Garantibank, Düsseldorf
Handelsbanken, Hamburg
ING Group, Frankfurt
Lloyds Banking Group, Berlin
Nordea, Frankfurt
Royal Bank of Scotland, Frankfurt
SEB AG, Frankfurt
Société Générale, Frankfurt
Hanseatic Bank, Hamburg
Targobank, Düsseldorf
Triodos Bank, Frankfurt
UniCredit Bank AG, Munich

Swiss and overseas banks

Bank of Communications, Frankfurt
Bank Sepah, Frankfurt
Citibank Privatkunden, Düsseldorf (since December 2008 part of French Crédit Mutuel bank)
Citigroup Global Markets Deutschland (Corporate Bank), Frankfurt
Credit Suisse
Goldman Sachs, Frankfurt
ICICI Bank, Eschborn
JP Morgan, Frankfurt
Julius Baer, Frankfurt
Lazard, Frankfurt, Hamburg
Merrill Lynch, Frankfurt
MUFG Bank (Europe) N.V. Germany Branch, Düsseldorf
Mizuho Bank Ltd., Düsseldorf
Morgan Stanley, Frankfurt
National Bank of Pakistan, Frankfurt
Nomura Financial Products Europe, Frankfurt
State Bank of India, Frankfurt
Sumitomo Mitsui Banking Corporation, Düsseldorf
UBS AG, Frankfurt
Vakifbank, Cologne

Smaller private banks 

Bankhaus C. L. Seeliger, Wolfenbüttel
Bankhaus Lampe, Bielefeld (Düsseldorf Headquarter)
Internationales Bankhaus Bodensee, Friedrichshafen
Merck Finck & Co, Munich 
Bankhaus Löbbecke, Berlin
Donner & Reuschel, Hamburg
Hauck & Aufhäuser, Frankfurt
Berenberg Bank, Hamburg
Bierbaum & Co, Frankfurt
Degussa Bank, Frankfurt
HSBC Trinkaus & Burkhardt AG, Düsseldorf
IKB Deutsche Industriebank, Düsseldorf
Merkur Bank, Munich
Metzler Bank, Frankfurt
Südwestbank AG, Stuttgart
Norisbank, Bonn
Walser Privatbank, Düsseldorf

Special operations banks 

Baader Wertpapierhandelsbank, Unterschleißheim
Bank für Sozialwirtschaft AG, Cologne
BMW Bank, Munich
Deutsche Apotheker- und Ärztebank, Düsseldorf
Deutsche Wertpapier Service Bank, Frankfurt
DVB Bank, Frankfurt
European Bank for Financial Services (ebase), Aschheim
Edekabank, Hamburg
GEFA Bank, Wuppertal
Mercedes-Benz Bank, Stuttgart
Pax Bank, Cologne
Reisebank, Frankfurt (100% DZ Bank)
Siemens Bank GmbH, Munich, 100% Siemens Financial Services
Toyota Kreditbank GmbH, Cologne
Umweltbank, Nuremberg
VEM Aktienbank AG, Munich
Volkswagen Bank, Braunschweig

References

External links 
List of banks in the Germany with SWIFT codes

Germany
 
Banks
Germany